First Sergeant Leonard Alfred Funk Jr. (August 27, 1916 – November 20, 1992) was a United States Army Medal of Honor recipient and one of the most decorated soldiers and paratroopers of World War II. While serving with the 508th Parachute Infantry Regiment (508th PIR), then part of the 82nd Airborne Division, he also received the Distinguished Service Cross, Silver Star, Bronze Star Medal, and three Purple Hearts.

Biography
Funk was born on August 27, 1916, in Braddock Township, Pennsylvania.

World War II
Funk joined the United States Army from Wilkinsburg, Pennsylvania, in June 1941. The following year, after the United States entered World War II, he volunteered for the paratroopers, part of the U.S. Army's newly created airborne forces. After completing his training and earning his jump wings, he was assigned to Company 'C' of the 1st Battalion, 508th Parachute Infantry Regiment (508th PIR), then stationed in Camp Blanding, Florida. He was to serve with the 508th throughout the war and went with the regiment to England in late 1943, where they became part of the veteran 82nd Airborne Division. He jumped into Normandy with the 508th on D-Day, June 6, 1944, later taking part in Operation Market Garden in September, and later in the Battle of the Bulge in December.

Despite being greatly outnumbered, Funk opened fire and called for the captured American guards to seize the Germans' weapons. He and the guards successfully killed or re-captured all of the German soldiers. For these actions, he was awarded the Medal of Honor on September 5, 1945.

Funk was honorably discharged from the army in June 1945.

Post-war
Funk worked for the Veteran's Administration after the war and retired in 1972. He died at age 76 and was buried in Arlington National Cemetery, Arlington County, Virginia.

Awards and decorations

Medal of Honor
First Sergeant Funk's official Medal of Honor citation reads:

See also

List of Medal of Honor recipients
List of Medal of Honor recipients for World War II

References

 

1916 births
1992 deaths
Military personnel from Pennsylvania
United States Army personnel of World War II
Burials at Arlington National Cemetery
People from Allegheny County, Pennsylvania
Recipients of the Silver Star
Recipients of the Distinguished Service Cross (United States)
United States Army Medal of Honor recipients
United States Army soldiers
World War II recipients of the Medal of Honor